Fountain Court Chambers is a set of commercial barristers based in the Temple in London and with offices in Singapore. It has 95 full members (in addition to door tenants), of whom 41 are silks. It is in the Magic Circle.

The present Head of Chambers, since 2018, is Bankim Thanki QC, the Deputy Head of Chambers is Patrick Goodall QC, the Senior Clerk is Alex Taylor and the Head of Administration is Julie Parker.

History
It is possible to trace Fountain Court's origins to the early part of the Twentieth Century, but its period of sustained success dates from after the Second World War.

Its reputation for commercial litigation developed in the late 1940s and 1950s and its standing as a 'magic circle' chambers was cemented in the 1960s and 1970s.

Numerous members of chambers have gone on to hold high judicial office. The most eminent is Lord Bingham KG, who served as Master of the Rolls, Lord Chief Justice and Senior Law Lord. Other notable members include Leslie Scarman SC (later Lord Scarman), Alan Orr QC (later Lord Justice Orr), Melford Stevenson QC (later Mr Justice Melford Stevenson), Peter Webster QC (later Mr Justice Webster), Peter Scott QC (Head of Chambers 1994-1999 and former Chairman of the Bar), Conrad Dehn QC (Head of Chambers 1984-1989), Christopher Bathurst QC (Viscount Bledisloe and Head of Chambers 1989-1994), Mark Potter QC (later President of the Family Division), Henry Brooke QC (later Lord Justice Brook and Vice-President of the Civil Division of the Court of Appeal), Denis Henry QC (later Lord Justice Henry), Lord Goldsmith QC (later Attorney General), Trevor Philipson QC, Charles Falconer QC (later Lord Chancellor), Nicholas Underhill QC (now Lord Justice Underhill), Nicholas Stadlen QC (later Mr Justice Stadlen), Marcus Smith QC (now Mr Justice Marcus Smith), David Waksman QC (now Mr Justice Waksman), Professor Andrew Burrows QC (now Lord Burrows, a Justice of the Supreme Court), Michael Green QC (now Mr Justice Michael Green) and Sir Francis Jacobs QC (later Advocate General of the European Court of Justice).

Notable current members include Richard Lissack QC, David Railton QC, Timothy Dutton CBE QC (Head of Chambers 2008-2013 and former Chairman of the Bar), Stephen Moriarty QC (Head of Chambers 2013-2018 and Chairman of the Commercial Bar Association), Bankim Thanki QC (current Head of Chambers), Patricia Robertson QC (past Vice-Chair of the Bar Standards Board), Mark Simpson QC, Richard Handyside QC, Leigh-Ann Mulcahy QC, Andrew Mitchell QC (current Vice-Chair of the Bar Standards Board), Patrick Goodall QC (current Deputy Head of Chambers), Anneliese Day QC and Ben Valentin QC.

Other recent Heads of Chambers include Anthony Boswood QC (1999-2003) and Michael Brindle QC (2003-2008), who are both now door tenants.

Other current door tenants include Lord Wilson (a former Justice of the Supreme Court), Sir Mark Potter, Sir Andrew Smith, Professor Lawrence Boo (Singapore), Gaurav Pachnanda SA (India), Kanaga Dharmananda SC (Australia), Peter Watts QC (New Zealand), Zal Andhyarujina SA (India), Arvind P Datar SA (India) and Ian Benjamin SC (Trinidad and Tobago).

In 2014, Fountain Court opened an office in Singapore's financial district.

Notable cases
Members of Fountain Court Chambers have appeared in many landmark cases and high-profile commercial disputes.

In the well-known House of Lords’ case of Caparo v Dickman, all counsel on both sides were from Fountain Court. Several members of the Chambers were also prominent figures in acting for the Bank of England in the celebrated Three Rivers litigation, a case which led to several appeals to the House of Lords. Numerous members of Fountain Court Chambers were involved in the Lloyds litigation which dominated the work of the Commercial Court in the 1990s, and produced two significant appeals in the House of Lords. 

More recently, many members have been involved in Bank Charges litigation (a test case which ended up in the House of Lords), the RBS Rights Issue case, various high-value PPI matters and the FCA Test Case regarding business interruption insurance claims arising as a result of the global COVID-19 pandemic (proceeding both to the High Court and by way of 'leapfrog' appeal to the Supreme Court).

Other recent substantial cases in which members of Fountain Court appeared include Springwell Navigation v JPMorgan Chase and Stone & Rolls Ltd v Moore Stephens (House of Lords), R (on the application of Prudential PLC) v HMRC, Bank Mellat v Her Majesty's Treasury (No. 2), SFO v ENRC, the Tchenguiz litigation, HP/Autonomy, the Ingenious litigation, Times Travel v PIA, Law Debenture v Ukraine and in litigation arising from Barclays' $11 billion 2008 capitral raising in Qatar.

External links 
 Fountain Court Chambers home page

Law firms based in London
Barristers' chambers in the United Kingdom